Georges Henri Joseph Édouard Lemaître (17 July 1894 – 20 June 1966) was a Belgian Catholic priest, theoretical physicist, mathematician, astronomer, and professor of physics at the Catholic University of Louvain. He was the first to theorize that the recession of nearby galaxies can be explained by an expanding universe, which was observationally confirmed soon afterwards by Edwin Hubble. He first derived "Hubble's law", now called the Hubble–Lemaître law by the IAU, and published the first estimation of the Hubble constant in 1927, two years before Hubble's article. Lemaître also proposed the "Big Bang theory" of the origin of the universe, calling it the "hypothesis of the primeval atom", and later calling it "the beginning of the world".

Early life 

Lemaître was born in Charleroi, Belgium, the eldest of four children. His father Joseph Lemaître was a prosperous industrial weaver and his mother was Marguerite, née Lannoy. After a classical education at a Jesuit secondary school, the Collège du Sacré-Coeur, in Charleroi, in Belgium, he began studying civil engineering at the Catholic University of Louvain at the age of 17. In 1914, he interrupted his studies to serve as an artillery officer in the Belgian army for the duration of World War I. At the end of hostilities, he received the Belgian War Cross with palms.

After the war, he studied physics and mathematics, and began to prepare for the diocesan priesthood, not for the Jesuits. He obtained his doctorate in 1920 with a thesis entitled l'Approximation des fonctions de plusieurs variables réelles (Approximation of functions of several real variables), written under the direction of Charles de la Vallée-Poussin. He was ordained a priest on 22 September 1923 by Cardinal Désiré-Joseph Mercier.

In 1923, he became a research associate in astronomy at the University of Cambridge, spending a year at St Edmund's House (now St Edmund's College, University of Cambridge). There he worked with Arthur Eddington, a devout Quaker and physicist who introduced him to modern cosmology, stellar astronomy, and numerical analysis. He spent the next year at Harvard College Observatory in Cambridge, Massachusetts, with Harlow Shapley, who had just gained renown for his work on nebulae, and at the Massachusetts Institute of Technology (MIT), where he registered for the doctoral program in sciences.

Career 

On his return to Belgium in 1925, he became a part-time lecturer at the Catholic University of Louvain and began the report that was published in 1927 in the Annales de la Société Scientifique de Bruxelles (Annals of the Scientific Society of Brussels) under the title "Un Univers homogène de masse constante et de rayon croissant rendant compte de la vitesse radiale des nébuleuses extragalactiques" ("A homogeneous Universe of constant mass and growing radius accounting for the radial velocity of extragalactic nebulae"), that was later to bring him international fame. In this report, he presented the new idea that the universe is expanding, which he derived from General Relativity. This idea later became known as Hubble's law, even though Lemaître was the first to provide an observational estimate of the Hubble constant. The initial state he proposed was taken to be Einstein's own model of a finitely sized static universe. The paper had little impact because the journal in which it was published was not widely read by astronomers outside Belgium. Arthur Eddington reportedly helped translate the article into English in 1931, but the part of it pertaining to the estimation of the "Hubble constant" was not included in the translation for reasons that remained unknown for a long time. This issue was clarified in 2011 by Mario Livio: Lemaître omitted those paragraphs himself when translating the paper for the Royal Astronomical Society, in favour of reports of newer work on the subject, since by that time Hubble's calculations had already improved on Lemaître's earlier ones.

At this time, Einstein, while not taking exception to the mathematics of Lemaître's theory, refused to accept that the universe was expanding; Lemaître recalled his commenting "" ("Your calculations are correct, but your physics is atrocious"). In the same year, Lemaître returned to MIT to present his doctoral thesis on The gravitational field in a fluid sphere of uniform invariant density according to the theory of relativity. Upon obtaining his Ph.D., he was named ordinary professor at the Catholic University of Louvain.

In 1931, Arthur Eddington published in the Monthly Notices of the Royal Astronomical Society a long commentary on Lemaître's 1927 article, which Eddington described as a "brilliant solution" to the outstanding problems of cosmology. The original paper was published in an abbreviated English translation later on in 1931, along with a sequel by Lemaître responding to Eddington's comments. Lemaître was then invited to London to participate in a meeting of the British Association on the relation between the physical universe and spirituality. There he proposed that the universe expanded from an initial point, which he called the "Primeval Atom". He developed this idea in a report published in Nature. Lemaître's theory appeared for the first time in an article for the general reader on science and technology subjects in the December 1932 issue of Popular Science. Lemaître's theory became better known as the "Big Bang theory," a picturesque term playfully coined during a 1949 BBC radio broadcast by the astronomer Fred Hoyle, who was a proponent of the steady state universe and remained so until his death in 2001.

Lemaître's proposal met with skepticism from his fellow scientists. Eddington found Lemaître's notion unpleasant. Einstein thought it unjustifiable from a physical point of view, although he encouraged Lemaître to look into the possibility of models of non-isotropic expansion, so it is clear he was not altogether dismissive of the concept. Einstein also appreciated Lemaître's argument that Einstein's model of a static universe could not be sustained into the infinite past.

With Manuel Sandoval Vallarta, Lemaître discovered that the intensity of cosmic rays varied with latitude because these charged particles are interacting with the Earth's magnetic field. In their calculations, Lemaître and Vallarta made use of MIT's differential analyzer computer developed by Vannevar Bush. They also worked on a theory of primary cosmic radiation and applied it to their investigations of the sun's magnetic field and the effects of the galaxy's rotation.

Lemaître and Einstein met on four occasions: in 1927 in Brussels, at the time of a Solvay Conference; in 1932 in Belgium, at the time of a cycle of conferences in Brussels; in California in January 1933; and in 1935 at Princeton. In 1933 at the California Institute of Technology, after Lemaître detailed his theory, Einstein stood up, applauded, and is supposed to have said, "This is the most beautiful and satisfactory explanation of creation to which I have ever listened." However, there is disagreement over the reporting of this quote in the newspapers of the time, and it may be that Einstein was not referring to the theory as a whole, but only to Lemaître's proposal that cosmic rays may be the leftover artifacts of the initial "explosion".

In 1933, when he resumed his theory of the expanding universe and published a more detailed version in the Annals of the Scientific Society of Brussels, Lemaître achieved his greatest public recognition. Newspapers around the world called him a famous Belgian scientist and described him as the leader of new cosmological physics. Also in 1933, Lemaître served as a visiting professor at The Catholic University of America.

On July 27, 1935, he was named an honorary canon of the Malines cathedral by Cardinal Josef Van Roey.

He was elected a member of the Pontifical Academy of Sciences in 1936, and took an active role there, serving as its president from March 1960 until his death.

In 1941, he was elected a member of the Royal Academy of Sciences and Arts of Belgium. In 1946, he published his book on L'Hypothèse de l'Atome Primitif (The Primeval Atom Hypothesis). It was translated into Spanish in the same year and into English in 1950.

In relation to Catholic teaching on the origin of the Universe, Lemaître viewed his theory as neutral with neither a connection nor a contradiction of the Faith; as a devoted Catholic priest, Lemaître was opposed to mixing science with religion, although he held that the two fields were not in conflict.

During the 1950s, he gradually gave up part of his teaching workload, ending it completely when he took emeritus status in 1964. In 1962, strongly opposed to the expulsion of French speakers from the Catholic University of Louvain, he created the ACAPSUL movement together with Gérard Garitte to fight against the split.

During the Second Vatican Council of 1962–65 he was asked by Pope John XXIII to serve on the 4th session of the Pontifical Commission on Birth Control. However, since his health made it impossible for him to travel to Rome – he suffered a heart attack in December 1964 – Lemaître demurred, expressing surprise that he was chosen. He told a Dominican colleague, Père Henri de Riedmatten, that he thought it was dangerous for a mathematician to venture outside of his area of expertise. He was also named domestic prelate (Monsignor) in 1960 by Pope John XXIII.

At the end of his life, he was increasingly devoted to problems of numerical calculation. He was a remarkable algebraicist and arithmetical calculator. Since 1930, he had used the most powerful calculating machine of the time, the Mercedes-Euklid. In 1958, he was introduced to the University's Burroughs E 101, its first electronic computer. Lemaître maintained a strong interest in the development of computers and, even more, in the problems of language and computer programming.

He died on 20 June 1966, shortly after having learned of the discovery of cosmic microwave background radiation, which provided further evidence for his proposal about the birth of the universe.

Work 

Lemaître was a pioneer in applying Albert Einstein's theory of general relativity to cosmology. In a 1927 article, which preceded Edwin Hubble's landmark article by two years, Lemaître derived what became known as Hubble's law and proposed it as a generic phenomenon in relativistic cosmology. Lemaître was also the first to estimate the numerical value of the Hubble constant.

Einstein was skeptical of this paper. When Lemaître approached Einstein at the 1927 Solvay Conference, the latter pointed out that Alexander Friedmann had proposed a similar solution to Einstein's equations in 1922, implying that the radius of the universe increased over time. (Einstein had also criticized Friedmann's calculations, but withdrew his comments.) In 1931, his annus mirabilis, Lemaître published an article in Nature setting out his theory of the "primeval atom."

Friedmann was handicapped by living and working in the USSR, and died in 1925, soon after inventing the Friedmann–Lemaître–Robertson–Walker metric. Because Lemaître spent almost his entire career in Europe, his scientific work is not as well known in the United States as that of Hubble or Einstein, both well known in the U.S. by virtue of residing there. Nevertheless, Lemaître's theory changed the course of cosmology. This was because Lemaître:
 Was well acquainted with the work of astronomers, and designed his theory to have testable implications and to be in accord with observations of the time, in particular to explain the observed redshift of galaxies and the linear relation between distances and velocities;
 Proposed his theory at an opportune time, since Edwin Hubble would soon publish his velocity–distance relation that strongly supported an expanding universe and, consequently, Lemaître's Big Bang theory;
 Had studied under Arthur Eddington, who made sure that Lemaître got a hearing in the scientific community.

Both Friedmann and Lemaître proposed relativistic cosmologies featuring an expanding universe. However, Lemaître was the first to propose that the expansion explains the redshift of galaxies. He further concluded that an initial "creation-like" event must have occurred. In the 1980s, Alan Guth and Andrei Linde modified this theory by adding to it a period of inflation.

Einstein at first dismissed Friedmann, and then (privately) Lemaître, out of hand, saying that not all mathematics lead to correct theories. After Hubble's discovery was published, Einstein quickly and publicly endorsed Lemaître's theory, helping both the theory and its proposer get fast recognition.

Lemaître was also an early adopter of computers for cosmological calculations. He introduced the first computer to his university (a Burroughs E 101) in 1958 and was one of the inventors of the Fast Fourier transform algorithm.

In 1931, Lemaître was the first scientist to propose the expansion of the universe was actually accelerating, which was confirmed observationally in the 1990s through observations of very distant Type IA supernova with the Hubble Space Telescope which led to the 2011 Nobel Prize in Physics.

In 1933, Lemaître found an important inhomogeneous solution of Einstein's field equations describing a spherical dust cloud, the Lemaître–Tolman metric.

In 1948 Lemaître published a polished mathematical essay "Quaternions et espace elliptique" which clarified an obscure space. William Kingdon Clifford had cryptically described elliptic space in 1873 at a time when versors were too common to mention. Lemaître developed the theory of quaternions from first principles so that his essay can stand on its own, but he recalled the Erlangen program in geometry while developing the metric geometry of elliptic space.

Lemaître was the first theoretical cosmologist ever nominated in 1954 for the Nobel Prize in Physics for his prediction of the expanding universe. He was also nominated for the 1956 Nobel Prize in Chemistry for his primeval atom theory.

Honours 
On 17 March 1934, Lemaître received the Francqui Prize, the highest Belgian scientific distinction, from King Leopold III. His proposers were Albert Einstein, Charles de la Vallée-Poussin and Alexandre de Hemptinne. The members of the international jury were Eddington, Langevin, Théophile de Donder and Marcel Dehalu. The same year he received the Mendel Medal of the Villanova University.

In 1936, Lemaître received the Prix Jules Janssen, the highest award of the Société astronomique de France, the French astronomical society.

Another distinction that the Belgian government reserves for exceptional scientists was allotted to him in 1950: the decennial prize for applied sciences for the period 1933–1942.

In 1953, he was given the inaugural Eddington Medal awarded by the Royal Astronomical Society.

Later, in December 2022, VRT recovered in its archives a lost 20-minute interview with Georges Lemaître in 1964, "a gem," says cosmologist Thomas Hertog.

On 17 July 2018, Google Doodle celebrated Georges Lemaître's 124th birthday.

On 26 October 2018, an electronic vote among all members of the International Astronomical Union voted 78% to recommend changing the name of the Hubble law to the Hubble–Lemaître law.

In 2019, he was the subject of a survey question: "Should  schools in America teach the creation theory of Catholic priest Georges Lemaitre as part of their science curriculum?"  53% of respondents said "No", presumably confusing his theory with Creationism.

In popular culture

Namesakes 
The lunar crater Lemaître
Lemaître coordinates
 Hubble–Lemaître law
Lemaître observers in the Schwarzschild vacuum frame fields in general relativity
Minor planet 1565 Lemaître
The fifth Automated Transfer Vehicle, Georges Lemaître ATV
Norwegian indie electronic band Lemaitre
The Maison Georges Lemaître is the main building of the University of Louvain's UCLouvain Charleroi campus, adjacent to Lemaître's birthplace

Bibliography 

 G. Lemaître, L'Hypothèse de l'atome primitif. Essai de cosmogonie, Neuchâtel (Switzerland), Editions du Griffon, and Brussels, Editions Hermès, 1946
 G. Lemaître, The Primeval Atom – An Essay on Cosmogony, New York-London, D. Van Nostrand Co, 1950.
 "The Primeval Atom," in Munitz, Milton K., ed., Theories of the Universe, The Free Press, 1957.

()

See also 
 Cold Big Bang
 List of Roman Catholic cleric-scientists
 List of Christians in science and technology
 Michał Heller – Polish Catholic priest and physicist/astronomer.

References

Notes

Citations

Sources

 

 

 

 

</ref>

Further reading 

 
 Berger, A.L., editor, The Big Bang and Georges Lemaître: Proceedings of a Symposium in honour of G. Lemaître fifty years after his initiation of Big-Bang Cosmology, Louvain-Ia-Neuve, Belgium, 10–13 October 1983 (Springer, 2013).
 
 Godart, Odon & Heller, Michal (1985) Cosmology of Lemaître, Pachart Publishing House.
 Farrell, John, The Day Without Yesterday: Lemaître, Einstein and the Birth of Modern Cosmology (Basic Books, 2005), .
 

 Turek, Jósef. Georges Lemaître and the Pontifical Academy of Sciences, Specola Vaticana, 1989.
 Lost video (1964) of Georges Lemaître, father of the Big Bang theory, recovered, https://phys.org/news/2023-01-lost-video-georges-lematre-father.html

External links 

 'A Day Without Yesterday': Georges Lemaître & the Big Bang
 Donald H. Menzel, "Blast of Giant Atom Created Our Universe", Modern Mechanics (December 1932)
 
 
Interview with Lemaître from 1964 (in French)

1894 births
1966 deaths
20th-century Belgian Roman Catholic priests
Alumni of St Edmund's College, Cambridge
Academic staff of the Catholic University of Leuven (1834–1968)
20th-century Belgian astronomers
Belgian Army personnel of World War I
Big Bang
Catholic clergy scientists
Catholic University of Leuven (1834–1968) alumni
Cosmologists
Harvard College Observatory people
Harvard University staff
Presidents of the Pontifical Academy of Sciences
Scientists from Charleroi
Recipients of the Croix de guerre (Belgium)
Relativity theorists
Walloon movement activists